Joseph S. Stauffer Library or Stauffer is the main social science and humanities library of Queen's University in Kingston, Ontario, Canada. Construction was completed in 1994 at a cost of C$42 million, funded partially by the Ontario government and the Joseph S. Stauffer Foundation.

The library is the largest building on the university campus, with Postmodern architecture referencing the Neo-Gothic style by architecture firm Kuwabara Payne McKenna Blumberg Architects (KPMB). It won the 1997 Governor General's Award for Architecture.

The library features include:
Adaptive Technology Centre 
Art Collection 
MADGIC-Maps, Data and Government Information Centre 
Map and Air Photo Collection 
Social Science Data Centre 
Wallach-Groome Sustainability Centre

Partnerships and collaboration
The Queens University Library is a member of the Association of Research Libraries, Canadian Association of Research Libraries, and the Ontario Council of University Libraries. The Queens University Library is a contributor to the Open Content Alliance

References

Jenner, Paulette. Queen's University, History: Campus & People, Joseph S. Stauffer Library, 2002: https://web.archive.org/web/20070102020714/http://www.queensu.ca/secretariat/History/bldgs/stauff.html

External links
KPMB Architects
Stauffer Library

Library buildings completed in 1994
Academic libraries in Canada
Buildings and structures in Kingston, Ontario
Libraries in Ontario
Postmodern architecture in Canada
1994 establishments in Ontario
Libraries established in 1994